USS Francovich has been the name of more than one United States Navy ship, and may refer to:

 , a destroyer escort cancelled in 1944
 USS Francovich (DE-606), a destroyer escort converted during construction into the fast transport 
 , a fast transport in commission from 1945 to 1946

United States Navy ship names